Amsacta nigrisignata is a moth of the family Erebidae. It was described by Max Gaede in 1923. It is found in mainly in Ethiopia, but also other parts of Africa.

References

Moths described in 1923
Spilosomina
Insects of Ethiopia
Moths of Africa